Keaton Simons (born July 20, 1978) is an American recording and performing artist. He is signed to Best Revenge Records, his independent label created in 2012. His music has been featured on shows such as Sons of Anarchy, Hollywood Heights, Private Practice, NCIS: Los Angeles, Crash, Suits, American Dad!, Harper's Island, and The Cleaner.

In the spring of 2013, Simons released his second full-length album Beautiful Pain on Best Revenge Records. The album was co-produced with Mikal Blue and mastered by Gavin Lurssen of Lurssen Mastering. It also includes co-written songs with Jason Mraz, Jason Reeves, Glen Phillips and Mikal Blue among others. With the exception of the drums, which are played by the United Nations' musical director Robin DiMaggio, all instruments on Beautiful Pain were played by Simons. Additional featured artists on the record include Alex Al (bass), Lenny Castro (percussion), Zac Rae (keys), Tyler Hilton (piano, vocals), Tower of Power's Bill Churchville (trumpet, trombone) and Sean Hill (saxophone).

Simons' debut EP Currently was released on Maverick Records in 2004 and his debut full-length album Can You Hear Me was released on CBS Records in 2008. He has toured nationally and internationally, opening for Coldplay, Train, Guster and REO Speedwagon, amongst others. He has also worked as a writer, musical director, singer, bassist and guitarist with such notable acts as Chris Cornell, Gnarls Barkley, Snoop Dogg, Josh Kelley and Tre Hardson.

In 2011, Simons appeared on VH1's Celebrity Rehab with Dr. Drew alongside stepfather, actor Eric Roberts, who was a patient. A performance of his song “Unstoppable” on the show resulted in over 10,000 iTunes downloads in only two days.

He has made guest appearances on The Late Late Show with Craig Ferguson, Malcolm in the Middle, and American Dreams. Simons also appeared in the feature film Hollywood Dreams. He made a cameo in the 2013 season finale of Showtimes's Californication, on screen with David Duchovny and Maggie Grace.  Duchovny wrote songs for Simons' 2015 album Hell or Highwater while sitting in sessions with Simons.

Simons has the distinction of having been on the set of a major motion picture before birth.  His mother, Eliza Roberts, then Eliza Garrett, was pregnant with him when she appeared as "Brunella" in National Lampoon's Animal House.

Simons lives in California and Nashville. He is currently playing lead guitar with Brett Young.

References

Living people
American performance artists
1978 births
Singers from Los Angeles
Place of birth missing (living people)